Mary Peters (1852–1921) was an Umpqua woman who operated a ferry across the Rogue River.

Life
Peters's father, known as Umpqua Joe, was a member of the Grave Creek band of the Umpqua people who was known for warning settlers and miners in the Grants Pass area of an impending attack from local Indians in 1855. Peters's father was reportedly allowed to stay on his land after the end of the Rogue River Wars rather than be removed to a reservation. Mary Peters, popularly known as "Indian Mary" – not to be confused with a different Native American woman also living in Oregon during the same period (Kalliah Tumulth, a Watlala Chinook) and also known as "Indian Mary" – lived on the land where her father had operated a ferry to transport miners and supplies in Southern Oregon until his death on November 13, 1886. After his death, Peters applied for a claim for the land under the Dawes Act, also known as the "Indian Homestead Act." Eight years later, she received a little more than 72 acres. Her 25-year land deed has often been described as the smallest Indian reservation in the United States. In 1958, the land was converted by Josephine County to Indian Mary Park, named after Peters.

She continued to operate her father's ferry business after his death. In 1894 she leased the ferry to William Massie and moved with her two surviving daughters to Grants Pass. She moved to Salem in 1920 to be near her daughters. Peters died in 1921 and is buried in Salem's City View Cemetery.

Legacy
The papers of Mary Peters and her daughters, Rosetta Farlow and Lillian Fairfield, are housed in the Siletz Tribal Cultural Collections in Siletz, Oregon.

See also
Confederated Tribes of Siletz Indians
Historic ferries in Oregon

References

1852 births
1921 deaths
Burials at City View Cemetery
19th-century Native American women
People from Grants Pass, Oregon
Rogue River (Oregon)
20th-century Native American women
20th-century Native Americans
Native American people from Oregon